Farhan Mehboob (born 23 October 1988 in Nawa Kalay, Peshawar) is a professional squash player who represented Pakistan. He reached a career-high world ranking of World No. 16 in May 2009.

Family
Mehboob is coached by his father, Mehboob Khan. He is the nephew of Jansher Khan.

Career
Mehboob was part of the gold medal-winning team at the Asian Games in Guangzhou, China.

References

External links
  (archive 3)
 
 

1988 births
Living people
Pakistani male squash players
Racket sportspeople from Peshawar
Commonwealth Games competitors for Pakistan
Squash players at the 2010 Commonwealth Games
Asian Games medalists in squash
Asian Games gold medalists for Pakistan
Squash players at the 2010 Asian Games
Squash players at the 2014 Asian Games
Medalists at the 2010 Asian Games
South Asian Games medalists in squash
South Asian Games gold medalists for Pakistan
South Asian Games bronze medalists for Pakistan